Metro West Ambulance is an ambulance company based in the U.S. state of Oregon with ambulances and wheelie vans along the Oregon Coast (under the names Pacific West Ambulance, Bay Cities Ambulance, and Medix Ambulance). Metro West also manages the Vernonia Volunteer Ambulance Association. In addition to daily emergency ambulance services, Metro West also serves customers through a comprehensive wheelchair van service, special event medical support for Portland's Moda Center, the Oregon State Fair, and many other events throughout the year. Metro West also offers community medical and preparedness training with Education for Life through the American Heart Association.

Accreditation
Metro West Ambulance is accredited through the Commission on Accreditation of Ambulance Services.

Honors
 Oregon DHS Commitment to Quality medal, Special Events Division, 2002 
 Oregon DHS Commitment to Quality Medal, 2004  
 Oregon DHS EMS Unit Citation, Medix Ambulance, 2006

Competitive bidding
In 1996, Metro West Ambulance competed for the Washington County medical transport contract.

In 1997 Metro West won the Washington County, Oregon contract for 9-1-1 dispatch.

In 2006, Clackamas County, Oregon accepted a no-bid contract from Metro West competitor AMR over objections. Metro West was not present during the final discussions.

In 2007, unionized medics for area ambulance companies approved a strike. Their chief complaint centered on pay and benefits, with their company being compared to Metro West.

In 2008, Metro West lost a bid for BLS transports in Eugene, Oregon. Later, in 2015, Metro West won the Eugene/Springfield BLS transport contract, and began service on February 1, 2015.

Legal
In 2004, Metro West Ambulance successfully defended against a wrongful termination lawsuit by a former employee.

See also
 American Medical Response
 American Heart Association

References

External links
 PANDA Pediatric Ambulance
 CitySearch
 EMS Directory
 Washington County

Ambulance services in the United States
Companies based in Hillsboro, Oregon
Privately held companies based in Oregon
Transport companies established in 1953
1953 establishments in Oregon
Medical and health organizations based in Oregon
Health care companies established in 1953